Uncle Ugly's Underground is a 1978 role-playing game adventure for Tunnels & Trolls published by Flying Buffalo. It was written by Ugly John Carver. Although described on the cover as "The first level of a new complex of dungeon levels." to date only Level 1 has been released. A referee is required to play.

Plot summary
Uncle Ugly's Underground is a dungeon located beneath an extinct volcano. The Adventurers explore a series of strange rooms provided for Tunnels & Trolls.

Reception
Forrest Johnson reviewed Uncle Ugly's Underground in The Space Gamer No. 28. Johnson commented that "The dungeon will in short order chew up a party of the usual invincible solo-dungeon grads. Mostly traps and trickery, some fiendishly clever, some merely fiendish. But look out for the trolls with the zoot suits and violin cases."

References

Role-playing game supplements introduced in 1978
Tunnels & Trolls adventures